Ruins (2012) is a science fiction novel by American author Orson Scott Card, who is known for his novel Ender's Game. This novel continues the story of Rigg, and his strange powers. It is the second book in the Pathfinder series and is followed by Visitors, the first book is Pathfinder. The book was published on October 30, 2012.

Summary 
Rigg, Umbo, and Param escape through the wall, finally leaving Ramfold for the first time in their lives. In their ensuing journey through the other wallfolds and the past, they attempt to understand the history of life on Garden in order to avoid a future in which an enemy arrives to destroy the planet.

Reception 
Ruins received slightly less favorable reviews than Pathfinder. It was praised for the complexity and the handling of time-travel but criticized for repetitiveness of dialogue, the squabbling of the main characters, and slow pacing.

References 

2012 American novels
2012 science fiction novels
Novels by Orson Scott Card
Simon & Schuster books